EBT may refer to:

Commerce and economics
 Earnings before taxes
 Electronic benefit transfer
Employee benefit trust
 EuroBillTracker, a website for tracking Euro banknotes
 Exim Bank (Tanzania)

Science and technology
 Electron beam computed tomography
 Electron beam texturing
 Electron beam therapy
 Electronic benefit transfer
 Eriochrome Black T, a chemical indicator used in tests
 Evidence-based toxicology
 Evidence-based training - evidence-based training methodology.

Other uses
 Early Buddhist texts
 East Broad Top Railroad and Coal Company, an American railway
 Edenbridge Town railway station, in England
 Emery, Bird, Thayer Dry Goods Company, a defunct department store in Kansas City, Missouri
 The Esther Benjamins Trust, a British charity
 European Bowling Tour
 Examination before trial
 High School of Enterprise, Business, & Technology, in Brooklyn, New York City